The Bravados is a 1958 American Western film (color by DeLuxe) directed by Henry King, starring Gregory Peck and Joan Collins. The CinemaScope film was based on a novel of the same name, written by Frank O'Rourke.

Plot

Jim Douglass (Gregory Peck) is a rancher pursuing four outlaws he is convinced murdered his wife six months before. He rides into Rio Arriba, where these four men, Alfonso Parral (Lee Van Cleef), Bill Zachary (Stephen Boyd), Ed Taylor (Albert Salmi) and Lujan (Henry Silva), are in jail awaiting execution for an unrelated murder. Sheriff Eloy Sanchez (Herbert Rudley) allows Douglass to see the men.

In town, Douglass happens upon Josefa Velarde (Joan Collins), whom he met and fell in love with nearly five years previously in New Orleans. She has been looking after her late father's ranch and has never married. Douglass reveals that he did marry, is now a widower, and that he has a daughter (Maria Garcia Fletcher). Josefa later learns, from Rio Arriba's priest (Andrew Duggan), the truth of how Douglass' wife died.

Simms, the executioner, arrives. He waits until the townspeople are at church, then while pretending to check the men's height and weight, stabs the sheriff in the back. The sheriff manages to shoot and kill him, but the inmates escape and take a young woman named Emma as a hostage. A posse rides out immediately, but Douglass - with his extensive experience trailing these outlaws - waits until morning; he anticipates one of the prisoners will stay behind to cut off everybody at a pass, which is what happens. Douglass eventually catches up. The posse finds a dead man, who appears to be the real Simms.

The outlaws determine that Douglass is the man they must worry about most. Parral is assigned the job of ambushing him. Instead, Douglass takes him from behind. Parral begs for his life and insists, when Douglass shows him a photo of his wife, that he has never seen the woman. Douglass kills him, then sets out after the other three. Taylor hangs back, figuring he can take Douglass down. Douglass, however, evades his fire, then ropes him by the feet and hangs him upside-down from a tree.

The two remaining fugitives reach the house of John Butler (Gene Evans), a prospector and Douglass' neighbor. Butler tells the men he needs to get to work outside and leaves, in actuality attempting to escape. Zachary shoots and kills him; Lujan goes to retrieve a sack of coins which Butler had taken with him. While Lujan is doing this, Zachary rapes Emma. Lujan sees riders approaching, calls to Zachary, and they flee, leaving the girl behind. The riders turn out to be Josefa and one of her ranch-hands, who now spot Douglass coming toward them from another direction. The posse also arrives and Emma's father and fiancé find Emma.

Douglass goes to his ranch to get fresh mounts, but finds that the fugitives have taken his last horses. He leaves Josefa with his daughter. In a town just across the Mexican border, Douglass enters a bar and finds Zachary. The outlaw claims not to know the woman in the picture Douglass shows him and shouts at him to let him be. Douglass draws his gun, Zachary pulls his, and Douglass shoots him dead. He then goes on to the home of the fourth man, Lujan, who has a family of his own. When shown a photo of Douglass's wife, Lujan says he has never seen the woman before. He recalls that he and his companions had ridden past the ranch. Douglass points to Lujan's sack of coins and tells him that whoever killed his wife stole that from his ranch. Lujan explains that he took the bag from Butler, whereupon Douglass realizes that Butler was the murderer.

Now knowing that the four men whom he pursued had nothing to do with his wife's death, Douglass realizes that he is no better than they were, having killed three of them in cold blood. He returns to town and goes to the church to ask for forgiveness. The priest says that while he cannot condone Douglass' actions, he respects him for not making excuses for what he has done. Josefa arrives with Douglass' daughter, and they exit the church together.

Cast

 Gregory Peck as Jim Douglass
 Joan Collins as Josefa Velarde
 Stephen Boyd as Bill Zachary
 Albert Salmi as Ed Taylor
 Henry Silva as Lujan
 Kathleen Gallant as Emma Steimmetz
 Barry Coe as Tom
 George Voskovec as Gus Steinmetz
 Herbert Rudley as Sheriff Eloy Sanchez
 Lee Van Cleef as Alfonso Parral
 Andrew Duggan as Padre
 Ken Scott as Primo, Deputy Sheriff
 Gene Evans as Butler
 Joe DeRita as Simms' impostor
 Jason Wingreen as Nichols
 Ada Carrasco as Mrs. Parral

The film is notable for including a rare serious role for Joe DeRita who, around the time the film was released, became "Curly Joe" of the Three Stooges.

Production

The Bravados was filmed in Morelia, Mexico.  According to Stephen Boyd, filming was difficult because it was unusually rainy and cold for the region.

Reception

Critical response
When the film was released The New York Times film critic, A. H. Weiler, gave it a positive review, writing, "...The Bravados emerges as a credit to its makers. Director Henry King, who headed the troupe that journeyed down to the photogenic areas of Mexico's Michoacán and Jalisco provinces, has seen to it that his cast and story move at an unflagging pace...The canyons, towering mountains, forests and waterfalls of the natural locales used, make picturesque material for the color cameras. But the producers have given their essentially grim 'chase' equally colorful and arresting treatment."

On review aggregator website Rotten Tomatoes, the film holds an approval rating of 100% based on 5 critic reviews with an average rating of 8/10.

Awards and nominations

See also
 List of American films of 1958

References

External links

 
 
 
 The Bravados film trailer at ReelzChannel

1958 films
1958 Western (genre) films
1950s English-language films
20th Century Fox films
American films about revenge
American Western (genre) films
CinemaScope films
Films about capital punishment
Films about rape
Films based on American novels
Films based on Western (genre) novels
Films directed by Henry King
Films scored by Alfred Newman
Films scored by Hugo Friedhofer
Films scored by Lionel Newman
Revisionist Western (genre) films
1950s American films